Sweet Tea Recording Studio is a 24-track recording studio in Oxford, Mississippi owned by producer Dennis Herring and operated by Dawn Palladino.  It is located near the Oxford square and has clients ranging from Buddy Guy to Modest Mouse.

Musicians who record at Sweet Tea
 Animal Collective
 Actual Tigers
Gavin Degraw
 Brand New
The Hives
 Buddy Guy
 Colour Revolt
 Counting Crows
 Cracker
 Elvis Costello
 End of Fashion
 Fischerspooner
 Hed PE
 Jars of Clay
 Jessica Dobson
 James (Jimbo) Mathus
 Modest Mouse
 Mutemath
 Rush of Fools
 The Blueskins
 The Crimea
 The Walkmen
 This Club
 Wavves

References

Sweet Tea Recording Studio
Buildings and structures in Lafayette County, Mississippi